Robert Rubens is a Canadian former competitive figure skater. He is the 1973 Prague Skate bronze medalist and a three-time Canadian national medalist (bronze in 1973 and 1974, silver in 1975). He competed at three World Figure Skating Championships.

Results

References

 skatabase

Canadian male single skaters
Living people
Year of birth missing (living people)